Steadfast is one of two albums recorded by American jazz pianist John Hicks during his first studio session as leader in 1975. It was ultimately released on the Strata-East and Bellaphon Records labels in 1991.

Hicks's material covers "decades-old standards, time-tested jazz works and his own [...] originals". Critic Ken Dryden wrote that Hicks was "at the top of his game, with an excellent instrument and engineer in a London studio".

Track listing

Personnel
Design – Ulrich Hofmann
Digital mastering – Malcolm Addey
Photography – Manfred Rinderspacher
Piano – John Hicks
Digital transfer – Duncan Stanbury

References

Strata-East Records albums
John Hicks (jazz pianist) albums
1975 albums
Solo piano jazz albums